Zhang Li (born 19 October 1978) is a Chinese former track and field athlete who competed in the women's javelin throw. This was her lifetime best. She won an Asian Championship bronze in 2000 and took the bronze medal at the 2001 East Asian Games. She was the silver medallist at the 1996 Asian Junior Athletics Championships. She retired in 2009.

International competitions

References

External links

1978 births
Living people
Chinese female javelin throwers
21st-century Chinese women